Nowe Kupiski  is a village in the administrative district of Gmina Łomża, within Łomża County, Podlaskie Voivodeship, in north-eastern Poland. (8 mi (or 126 km) North-East of Warsaw, the country's capital city.

References

Nowe Kupiski